German Vasilyevich Kutarba (born 10 September 1978) is a Russian former professional footballer.

Club career
He made his professional debut in the Soviet Second League in 1991 for FC Dinamo Gagra.

International
At one point he was a candidate for the Russia's UEFA Euro 2004 roster, but was never actually called up.

Personal life
He was born in Abkhazia, a pro-Russia autonomous republic inside Georgian SSR. After the independent of Georgia, Dinamo Gagra refused to play in Georgian league and he then left for FC Zhemchuzhina Sochi, just about 50 km away in Krasnodar Krai, Russia.

References

1978 births
People from Gagra District
Living people
Footballers from Abkhazia
Russian people of Abkhazian descent
Russian footballers
Russia under-21 international footballers
Association football midfielders
Association football defenders
FC Zhemchuzhina Sochi players
FC Kuban Krasnodar players
FC Spartak Vladikavkaz players
FC Dynamo Moscow players
FC Akhmat Grozny players
FC Arsenal Kyiv players
FC Metalurh Zaporizhzhia players
SC Tavriya Simferopol players
FC SKA Rostov-on-Don players
Russian expatriate footballers
Expatriate footballers in Ukraine
Russian Premier League players
Ukrainian Premier League players
Russian expatriate sportspeople in Ukraine
FC Mashuk-KMV Pyatigorsk players